Hoàng Việt, real name Lê Chí Trực (28 February 1928– 31 December 1967) was a Vietnamese composer. He was a posthumous recipient of the Hồ Chí Minh Prize.

Selected works
Chị cả (1944-1946)
Biệt đô thành (1944-1945)
Tiếng còi trong sương đêm (with pen name Lê Trực, 1944-1945)
Thành đồng Tổ quốc (1949)
Lá xanh (1950)
Ai nghe chiến dịch mùa xuân (1950)
Tin tưởng (1951)
Đêm mưa dầm (1951)
Nhạc rừng (1951) 
Mùa lúa chín (1951)
Lên ngàn (1952)
Tình ca (1957) 
Tình ca 2
Quê mẹ (1958)
Quê hương, symphony (1965) 
Giết giặc Mỹ cứu nước (with penname Lê Quỳnh, 1965)
Cửu long (unfinished symphony, 1966)
Bài ca thanh niên miền Nam thành đồng (with pen name Lê Quỳnh, 1966)
Bông sen (musical drama, co-written with Lưu Hữu Phước and Ngô Y Linh)

References 

Vietnamese composers
Vietnamese animators
1928 births
1967 deaths
Ho Chi Minh Prize recipients
20th-century composers